Thomas John Curran (April 30, 1924 – July 17, 2012) was a United States district judge of the United States District Court for the Eastern District of Wisconsin.

Education and career

Born in Mauston, Wisconsin, Curran was in the United States Navy during World War II, from 1943 to 1946. He received a Bachelor in Naval Science degree from Marquette University in 1945 and a Bachelor of Laws from Marquette University Law School in 1948. He was in private practice in Mauston from 1948 to 1983.

Federal judicial service

On September 20, 1983, Curran was nominated by President Ronald Reagan to a seat on the United States District Court for the Eastern District of Wisconsin vacated by Judge Myron L. Gordon. Curran was confirmed by the United States Senate on November 4, 1983, and received his commission on November 7, 1983. He assumed senior status on January 1, 1997, serving in that status until his death in Mauston on July 17, 2012.

References

Sources
 

1924 births
2012 deaths
United States Navy personnel of World War II
Military personnel from Wisconsin
Judges of the United States District Court for the Eastern District of Wisconsin
Marquette University alumni
Marquette University Law School alumni
People from Mauston, Wisconsin
United States district court judges appointed by Ronald Reagan
20th-century American judges
United States Navy officers
Wisconsin lawyers